Aglaonema commutatum, the poison dart plant, is a species of flowering plant in the Chinese evergreen genus Aglaonema, family Araceae. It is native to the Philippines and northeastern Sulawesi, and has been introduced to other tropical locales, including Cuba, Puerto Rico, Trinidad and Tobago, Comoros, the Chagos Archipelago, India, Bangladesh, and the Cook Islands. Its hybrid cultivar 'Silver Queen' (with A. nitidum) has gained the Royal Horticultural Society's Award of Garden Merit as a houseplant.

Subtaxa
The following varieties are accepted:
Aglaonema commutatum var. commutatum – central Luzon
Aglaonema commutatum var. elegans  – central Luzon
Aglaonema commutatum var. maculatum  – central Luzon
Aglaonema commutatum var. warburgii  – northeast Sulawesi

References

commutatum
House plants
Flora of Luzon
Flora of Sulawesi
Plants described in 1856